The Antonov An-38 is a stretched and upgraded version of Antonov's earlier An-28. It is a twin-engined turboprop transport aircraft, designed by the Antonov Design Bureau in Kyiv, Ukraine. Production is in Novosibirsk, Russia, but some crucial parts are also made in Ukraine and Belarus. It first flew in 1994, and received international flight certification in April 2000. A total of 11 were built and 2 remain in airline service as of August 2019. A recent documentary says that only one remains in service with ALROSA Airlines in 2021.

Development
Impetus for a stretch of the Antonov An-28 design began with a 1989 sales tour in India, where it became clear that a significant market existed for an aircraft similar to the An-28, but with seating in the 25–30 seat range. The design was approved a year later, and was displayed at the 1991 Paris Air Show as a model.

The An-38 is of a similar design to the older An-28, featuring the same wings and tail; but it has a longer fuselage and includes several enhancements, such as higher fuel efficiency, increased comfort (cabin and cockpit), and decreased internal noise, coupled with better sound insulation. Other improvements include an increase in passengers to 27, thanks to an increase in maximum payload to 2,500 kg (5,500 lbs), as well as a maximum speed of 405 km/h (250 mph). Its design also enables it to operate in adverse conditions—it is equipped with weather radar, sophisticated navigational systems, and low pressure tires that allow it to operate from primitive, unpaved and icy airfields. Furthermore, the aircraft is more resistant to stalling at high angles of attack and is stable and maneuverable with ice on the wing and tail assembly.

Civil operators
As of August 2019, 2 Antonov An-38 aircraft remain in airline service with ALROSA. Recent reviews suggest only one remains in service in 2021.

Former operators

 Vostok Aviation Company

Specifications (An-38-100)

See also

References

Further reading 

 

An-038
Antonov An-038
Aircraft first flown in 1994
Twin-turboprop tractor aircraft
Twin-tail aircraft